Gornja Slabinja (Cyrillic: Горња Слабиња) is a village in the municipality of Kostajnica, Republika Srpska, Bosnia and Herzegovina.

See also 
 Donja Slabinja

References

Populated places in Republika Srpska
Villages in Bosnia and Herzegovina